Yazdi Naoshriwan Karanjia (born 3 March 1937, Valsad) is a Gujarati theatre person from India. He is based in Surat and widely noted as one of the doyens of Parsi theatre.

For more than 60 years, his troupe has performed comedy plays. With Chandravadan Mehta, he has created Tapitate Tapidas, a comedy radio series on Akashvani, which ran for more than 400 episodes. Later it was also published as a book. Some of his popular comedy plays include Bicharo Barjor, Dinshajina Dabba Gul and Kutarani Punchhadi Vanki. He rans Cambay Institute of Commerce, a coaching institute.

He was awarded with the Padma Shri, the fourth highest civilian award of India, for his services in the field of the arts.

He married Vira in 1961; they have 3 children.

References 

1937 births
Parsi people
Gujarati people
Recipients of the Padma Shri in arts
Living people
Gujarati theatre
People from Surat